Kawila (31 October 17421816), also known as Phra Boromrachathibodi, was the Northern Thai ruler of Chiangmai Kingdom and the founder of Chetton Dynasty. Originating from Lampang, Kawila arose to become the ruler of Chiangmai appointed by King Rama I as a tributary ruler. Kawila had a great role in the transfer of Lanna (modern Northern Thailand) from Burmese rule to Siamese domination and the rebuilding of Chiangmai as the center of Lanna.

Biography

Early life 
In the early eighteenth century when the influence of the Burmese Toungoo dynasty waned, Lanna exerted its independence but fragmented into several city-states. The ruler of Lamphun had taken control over the city of Lampang. The inhabitants of Lampang were dissatisfied with the rule of Lamphun and chose an animal hunter named Nan Thipchang or simply Thipchang to lead the Lampang forces to successfully expel the Lamphun from the city. Thipchang was declared as the ruler of Lampang in 1732 with the title of Phraya Sulawaluechai.

Kawila was born on 31 October 1742 at Lampang during the rule of his grandfather Lord Thipchang of Lampang. Kawila was a son of Chaikeaw who was a son of Thipchang. His mother was named Chantha. Kawila was the eldest among seven male siblings, who were later known as Chao Chetton or the Seven Princes, all of whom would later become influential figures in subsequent Lanna history. Kawila's younger brothers included Khamsom, Thammalangka, Duangthip, Moola, Khamfan and Boonma. His younger sisters were Si-Anocha, Si-Kanya and Si-Boonthan.

Thipchang died in 1759. Thao Linkang, a son of a previous ruler of Lampang, seized power in Lampang. Chaikaew then had to take refuge in Burma. Kawila and his family presumably travelled to Burma with his father. Only when the Burmese Konbaung dynasty sent armies into Lanna in 1762-1763 that the Burmese killed Thao Linkang and installed Chaikaew as the ruler of Lampang under Burmese sovereignty. In 1769, Thado Mindin (known in Thai sources as Po Myowun ) became the new Burmese governor of Chiangmai. Thado Mindin decided to hold Chaikaew as political hostage in Chiangmai, leaving Kawila in charge of affairs in Lampang on behalf of his father.

Resistance against Burmese rule 

At Chiangmai, Phaya Chaban, a local Lanna noble with personal name Boonma, came into conflicts with Thado Mindin the Burmese governor of Chiangmai in 1771. Kawila allied with Phaya Chaban in resistance against Burmese rule. In December 1774, King Taksin of Thonburi led an expedition to take the Burmese-held Chiangmai. Phaya Chaban decided to seek support from the upcoming Siamese against the Burmese and sent a secret message to Kawila at Lampang, urging Kawila to join his cause. Kawila was committed to the liberation from Burmese rule, thus initiating the "Feun Man" (meaning 'to liberate from the Burmese') movement.

Kawila devised a plan to overthrow the Burmese in Lampang. Kawila sent his younger brother Khamsom to lead an army to the south, pretending to fight Thonburi armies. Kawila then arose, killing Burmese officials in Lampang. The Burmese went to seek assistance from Khamsom. Khamsom stated that Kawila was acting on his own and his family as a whole was not involved. The Burmese were not convinced and informed the incidents to Thado Mindin at Chiangmai. Thado Mindin realized that Kawila and his family was insurrecting against Burmese rule. Thado Mindin then had Chaikaew in Chiangmai imprisoned.

King Taksin sent Chaophraya Chakri ahead as vanguard to Lampang. Kawila greeted King Taksin and Chaophraya Chakri and led them to Chiangmai. Siamese forces were able to take Chiangmai in January 1775. Two Lanna men in Chiangmai informed Kawila that his father Saikeaw was alive in prison. Kawila then rescued his father from the prison. However, Burmese chronicles stated that Thado Mindin had deported Chaikaew in chains to Ava. Kawila had to take a small force to rescue his father on his way to Burma.

Governor of Lampang (1775 - 1782) 

After the Chiangmai campaign, King Taksin returned to Lampang and officially appointed Kawila as the governor of Lampang in 1775. Kawila's younger brother Thammalangka was appointed as Uparaja or the vice-governor and heir. The ceremony of drinking sacred water to swear fealty to King Taksin was performed by Kawila and his brothers at the Wat Phra That Lampang Luang temple in Lampang. Chaophraya Surasi proposed to marry Lady Si-Anocha, a younger sister of Kawila. The Siamese also appointed Prince Withoon as the ruler of Nan. However, as soon as the Burmese at Chiangsaen found out that the Nan principality had switched to Siamese domination, they attacked Nan in 1775. Prince Withoon of Nan had to evacuate his city and seek assistance from Kawila at Lampang.

In January 1777, the Burmese King Singu Min sent a huge Burmese forces of 15,000 men to reclaim Chiangmai. As Siam had been devastated by the Maha Thiha Thura's invasion, the Siamese were unable to provide any military aids to northern Lanna cities. Phaya Chaban, who was then the governor of Chiangmai, was left with few thousand men to defend Chiangmai so he decided to evacuate the city. The Burmese proceeded to attack Lampang. Kawila, along with his father Chaikaew and his younger brothers, also had to evacuate Lampang due to inferior manpower and took refuge down south at Sawankhalok. After the Burmese had left, Kawila was able to reclaim his position at Lampang. However, Phaya Chaban failed to do the same and Chiangmai was left abandoned.

In 1777, Prince Withoon decided to restore his city of Nan on his own. Kawila then branded Withoon as a rebel. Kawila arrested Withoon and sent him to Thonburi, where Withoon died in prison. During the Siamese Invasion of Laos in 1778-1779, some Siamese forces spilled onto Lampang and pillaged the city. Kawila took his forces to expel the Siamese intruders. However, those defeated Siamese officials informed the Thonburi court that Kawila was in rebellion. King Taksin summoned Kawila to Thonburi to explain. However, Kawila defied Taksin by refusing to go to Thonburi. After repeated calls, Kawila and Phaya Chaban travelled south to meet the king at Thonburi in 1779. Phaya Chaban was imprisoned and died. King Taksin was furious at Kawila's defiance. Kawila's parts of ear pinna were cut off as punishment. Only when Kawila beseeched the king that he would stage attacks on Burmese-held Chiangsaen to compensate his guilts that Kawila was released and allowed to return to Lampang.

Pasang Period (1782 - 1797) 

Kawila was on his campaign to attack Chiangsaen when he learned of the regime change, in which King Rama I ascended the throne and established the Rattanakosin Kingdom in 1782. Kawila then took his younger brothers to visit the new king at Bangkok in 1782. King Rama I appointed Kawila as Phraya Wichienprakarn the nominal governor of Chiangmai. Khamsom was made the governor of Lampang instead. Kawila was tasked with the restoration of Chiangmai as the center of Lanna and forefront citadel against Burmese invasions. However, due to overall population decline in Lanna in the aftermath of continuous warfare, Kawila was unable to gather enough population to reestablish Chiangmai right away. Kawila took his position at Pasang, about forty kilometers to the south of Chiangmai instead as an entrepôt to accumulate people and resources to proceed to Chiangmai. Lampang remained as the main citadel among Kawila's dominions.

As Chiangmai and Nan were abandoned, Lampang stood as the main frontline citadel against Burmese incursions. During the Nine Armies' War, the Burmese army of 30,000 or 40,000 men from Chiangsaen led by Prince Thado Thiri Maha Uzana and Thado Mindin the Burmese governor of Chiangsaen (Thado Mindin was known in Thai sources as Abaya Kamani  in this period). laid siege on Lampang in January 1786. Kawila defended Lampang and requested military aid from Bangkok. Kawila managed to hold the city against Burmese besiegers for two months until the Siamese relief forces under Prince Chakchetsada and Chaophraya Mahasena Pli arrived to rescue Lampang in March 1786. The Burmese were successfully repelled and Lampang was saved.

In 1787, the rulers of Phrae and Mongyawng attacked the Burmese-held Chiangsaen. Thado Mindin the Burmese governor of Chiangsaen fled to Chiangrai where he was captured and sent to Kawila at Lampang. Kawila sent Thado Mindin to Bangkok. The Burmese then invaded Lampang from two directions, north and west, in retaliation. Kawila sent Phutthawong to engage with the Burmese at Yuam to the west but was defeated by the Burmese. The Burmese general Wungyi Maha Zeyathura, with his 45,000 Burmese men, laid siege on Lampang. Another Burmese general Letya Thiha Thingyan, with his 35,000 men, laid siege on Pasang. Kawila was in critical situation and again requested aid from Bangkok. Prince Sura Singhanat of the Front Palace, brother-in-law of Kawila, personally led the Bangkokian army of around 50,000 to 60,000 men to the north to relieve the siege of Lampang in 1788. The Burmese were defeated at Lampang and Pasang in March 1788.

King Rama I and Prince Sura Singhanat urged Kawila to take position in Chiangmai. Kawila renovated the city walls of Chiangmai in 1795. In February 1797, Kawila marched his armies and populace along with his younger brothers from Pasang to enter Chiangmai in an elaborate ritual per Lanna traditions. Kawila entered Chiangmai through the northern Changphueak Gate with a Lawa man with a dog and carrying a rattan pack in front of him. Kawila then spent a night laying in front of Wat Chiang Man before entering the palace the next morning. This ritual was a replication of the one followed by King Mangrai, the city's founder, five centuries earlier in 1296. Chiangmai was then officially restored as the center of authority in Lanna. Inhabitants of Lampang were also partitioned into the founding population of Chiangmai. After twenty years of abandonment, Chiangmai was eventually restored as the center of Lanna.

Burmese Invasions of Chiangmai 
As soon as Kawila took residence in Chiangmai in 1797, King Bodawpaya was determined to reclaim Lanna. Bodawpaya appointed Nemyo Kyawdin Thihathu as the leading general to lead the Burmese army of 55,000 men to invade Chiangmai through Mongnai and Mong Pan in 1797. Kawila then informed the Bangkok court about the incoming Burmese. King Rama I ordered his younger brother Prince Sura Singhanat, along with Prince Thepharirak and Prince Anouvong of Vientiane, to relieve Chiangmai of siege. The total number of Siamese rescue forces were 20,000 men, with additional 20,000 men from Laos under Anouvong. The Burmese were soundly defeated and repelled in April 1798.

Lanna had served as the defense against Burmese incursions from the north for Siam. However, the lack of manpower was the major disadvantage of Lanna in the face of Burmese invasions. Kawila then pursued the policy of "picking vegetables into baskets, putting people into towns" or forced resettlements of people from other towns to accumulate manpower. In 1802, King Bodawpaya appointed a Chinese man from Yunnan Province named Chom Hong as the ruler of Mong Hsat. Bodawpaya declared that Chom Hong of Mong Hsat would rule over the fifty-two towns of Lanna in direct challenge to Kawila. Kawila then sent his younger brother Thammalangka to seize Mong Hsat in 1802 and Chom Hong was captured. From Mong Hsat, Thammalangka proceeded to capture Kengtung. Sao Kawng Tai, the saopha of Kengtung, was captured to Chiangmai along with 6,000 Khün people from Kengtung and 5,000 from Mong Hsat, who were settled in the southern vicinity of Chiangmai.

Chiangmai's expedition of Mong Hsat and Kengtung in 1802 served as provocation for Bodawpaya to launch a new offensive onto Chiangmai in 1802. Prince Sura Singhanat again led the Siamese forces from Bangkok to aid Chiangmai. However, Prince Sura Singhanat fell ill at Thoen and assigned his nephew Prince Anurak Devesh to take over the command of Front Palace armies. Prince Anurak Devesh and Prince Thepharirak were able to repel the Burmese. The ailing Prince Sura Singhanat commanded Kawila to send troops to attack and take the Burmese-held Chiangsaen.

In 1800, Kawila named his new Chiangmai city as Rattana Tingsa Aphinawaburi, meaning the great new city that was the jeweled abode of Indra.

Reign as King of Chiangmai (1802 - 1816) 
In December 1802, King Rama I appointed Kawila as the "King of Chiangmai" as a tributary ruler in recognition of his contributions to the defense of northern frontiers. King Kawila's official regnal name was Phra Boromma Rachathibodi. King Rama granted Kawila the seven-tiered white umbrella, signifying the honor equal to the Siamese Crown Prince.

The Burmese had moved their base of authority from Chiangmai to Chiangsaen, which stood as the last stronghold of Burmese power in Lanna. Prince Sura Singhanat had commanded Kawila to take Chiangsaen to end the Burmese rule over Lanna. After becoming king, Kawila assigned most of military duties to his younger brother Thammalangka. Thammalangka, together with the younger brother Duangthip of Lampang, Prince Anouvong of Vientiane and Prince Atthawarapanyo of Nan, joined with the forces of Prince Thepharirak to lead the Siamese-Lanna-Lao attack on Chiangsaen in 1804. Chiangsaen fell to the invaders, destroying the last Burmese stronghold in Lanna. Northern Thai inhabitants of Chiangsaen were deported to many places including Chiangmai where they were settled in the eastern vicinity.

Lanna victory over Chiangsaen allowed it to expand into the northernmost Tai princedoms in the name of Siam. In 1804, King Rama I ordered the Lanna lords to conduct expeditions onto the northern Tai states of Chiangtung (Kengtung) and Chianghung (Sipsongpanna). In 1805, Thammalangka led troops to attack and conquer Mongyawng, deporting 10,000 people from Kengtung and Mongyawng to settle in Lamphun. The conglomeration of Tai Lue or Tai Yong people from Mongyawng at Lamphun led to the restoration of Lamphun in 1806 and establishment of Lamphun as the new princely seat in 1814, in which Khamfan, another younger brother of Kawila, became the prince of Lamphun.

As a trusted ally of the new Siamese monarchy, Kawila was largely left to govern his territories as he pleased. He promoted the revival of many traditional Lan Na cultural practices, including music, dance, literature and craftsmanship, as well as distinctive regional Buddhist ceremonies.

Kawila died in 1816 and was succeeded as the ruler of Chiang Mai by his brother Thammalangka. However, after Kawila, subsequent rulers of Chiangmai were not appointed as kings but were granted the rank of Phraya. Only about fifty years later in 1853 that the Bangkok court appointed a King of Chiangmai. One of Kawila's children, Kawilorot Suriyawong would later reign as king of Chiang Mai.

Family and Issue 
Kawila took a lady with the name of Nocha as his consort. He had the following children;

 Noi Suriyawong, given the position of Raxabut, died prematurely at Tak in an unknown incident in unknown date
 Nan Suriyawong, became Phraya Burirattana and later King Kawilorot Suriyawong (r. 1856 - 1870) of Chiangmai.
 Nan Mahavong
 Lady Khamsai
 Nan Chaisena

References 

Rulers of Chiang Mai
Chet Ton dynasty
19th-century Thai people
18th-century Thai people
18th-century Thai monarchs
19th-century Thai monarchs
18th century in Siam
1742 births
1816 deaths
Rulers of Lampang